is a village in Yamanashi Prefecture, Japan. , the village has an estimated population of 9,710 in 4028 households, and a population density of 390 persons per km2.

Geography
Oshino is located in southeastern Yamanashi Prefecture, in the foothills of Mount Fuji. The village is noted for its abundant spring water from Mount Fuji.

Neighboring municipalities
Yamanashi Prefecture
Fujiyoshida
Tsuru
Yamanakako

Climate
The village has a climate characterized by characterized by hot and humid summers, and relatively mild winters (Köppen climate classification Cfb).  The average annual temperature in Oshino is 9.4 °C. The average annual rainfall is 1804 mm with September as the wettest month.

Demographics
Per Japanese census data, the population of Oshino has grown steadily over the past 80 years.

History
During the Edo period, all of Kai Province was tenryō territory under direct control of the Tokugawa shogunate. With the establishment of the modern municipalities system in the early Meiji period on April 1, 1889, the village of Oshino was created within Minamitsuru District, Yamanashi Prefecture.

Economy
The world headquarters of FANUC are located in Oshino. The Japan Ground Self-Defense Force Camp Kita-Fuji is located in Oshino.

Education
Oshino has one public elementary school and one public junior high school operated by the village government. The  village does not have a high school.

Transportation

Railway
Oshino is not serviced by rail transportation.

Highway
The village is also not serviced by the national highway network.

Sister city relations
 - Charnay-lès-Mâcon, Saône-et-Loire, Bourgogne, France,

Local attractions
Oshino Hakkai, the Eight Springs of Mount Fuji

References

External links

Official Website 

 
Villages in Yamanashi Prefecture